The Beheadings of Moca (Spanish: Degüello de Moca; Haitian Creole: Masak nan Moca; French: Décapitation Moca) was a massacre that took place in Santo Domingo (now the Dominican Republic) in April 1805 when the invading Haitian army attacked civilians as ordered by Jean-Jacques Dessalines and Henri Christophe, just a year after the 1804 Haiti massacre. The event was narrated by survivor Gaspar Arredondo and Pichardo in his book Memoria de mi salida de la isla de Santo Domingo el 28 de abril de 1805 (Memory of my departure from the island of Santo Domingo on April 28, 1805), which was written shortly after the massacre. This massacre is part of a series of Haitian invasions to Santo Domingo and is part of Siege of Santo Domingo (1805). Haitian historian Jean Price-Mars wrote that the troops killed white, black and mixed inhabitants of Santo Domingo. This event has been portrayed in Haiti as a fight against slavery.

The raids, carried out by 40,000 Haitian soldiers, were headed by Henri Christophe and Jean-Jacques Dessalines, who were present during the action. Municipalities of Santo Domingo (Monte Plata, Cotuí, La Vega, Santiago, Moca, San Jose de las Matas, Monte Cristi, and San Juan de la Maguana) were reduced to ashes and troops killed Dominicans, including 40 children who were beheaded in a church in Moca, (hence where the infamous name of the massacre comes from), during a failed attempt to overthrow Jean-Louis Ferrand. Ferrand was later overthrown and beheaded, ironically by the father of future Dominican President Pedro Santana, on November 7, 1808 after the defeat in the Battle of Palo Hincado, that definitively put an end to the presence of any French rule on the island.

	The inhabitants of the Spanish-speaking side of the island inherit the Dominican national name, which is derived from the country Santo Domingo, since the early 17th century.

Events

Proclamation to the Dominicans

These events were narrated in the accounts of witness Gaspar de Arredondo y Pichardo, a young law student living in Santiago, Santo Domingo, who later fled to Cuba after surviving the genocide. Dessalines's intended targets were Ferrand and his French soldiers, but he had also warned the Dominican inhabitants in a letter to cooperate with him or risk death. In that letter, written in May 1804,  Dessalines writes: 

Gaspar de Arredondo y Pichardo details his account of the events in the book Recuerdo de mi salida de la isla de Santo Domingo el 28 de abril de 1805 (Memory of my departure from the island of Santo Domingo on April 28, 1805), which was discovered in Cuba and then handed over to the Dominican government for historical record.

The Genocide 

Having failed in his capturing of Santo Domingo, Dessalines, along with the army of Christophe,  retreated back to Haiti through the Cibao, but not before subjecting the Dominicans to a massacre, which subsequently escalated into a genocide. Haitian troops entered the cities and killed everyone they encountered, whether they were white, mixed or black. Some of the stories:

A well-known mixed-race tailor named Fernando Pimentel is mentioned in (44):

But these massacres didn't just occur in Moca alone, as explained in another excerpt of Pichardo, which was written by Eugenio Descamps, another survivor, he writes: 

  

The Haitian troops returned to Haiti after noticing French ships they thought were heading towards the western part of the island, which they believed were being sent to attack their country. Gaspar de Arredondo y Pichardo also relates that, in the retreat to Haiti, all the cities crossed and the population were reduced to ashes, even altars.
The Otsego Herald newspaper, based in Cooperstown, New York, published details of the massacre on the same month:

On their retreat, prisoners from every city subject to attack were rounded up by the army, and forced to walk barefoot and get beaten on their way to Haiti. From Santiago, an estimated 997 Dominicans were taken as captives, which included 249 women, 430 girls, and 318 boys. Deprived of food and water, many Dominicans along the way died of hunger and thirst.  The young girls and women were raped by the Haitian troops, some were even given to the soldiers as prizes to serve as their sex slaves. Soon after arriving in northern Haiti, Dessalines gave the order to have prisoners either killed on the spot, or forced to work on plantations.

Effect 

This massacre has been linked to the Parsley Massacre, and is seen as a contributor to the events that culminated during the regime of the future president Rafael Leónidas Trujillo to order that massacre.
 
The slaughter of the innocent, rape of women and young girls, burning of municipalities, and many other atrocities left a negative impression from the Dominican Republic about the intentions of Haiti, which later invaded Republic of Spanish Haiti during the Ephemeral Independence in 1822 after an unresisted invasion with the force of an estimated 10,000 of Haitian troops commanded by Jean-Pierre Boyer to unify the country with Haiti. Veteran Haitian history writer Jan Rogoziński quantified the population of Santo Domingo declining to 63,000, in 1819, due to attacks like The Beheadings of Moca. The Dominican population numbered 125,000 in 1789.
 
Haitian historiography portraits these massacres as necessary events to ensure the independence of its country for fear of the reestablishment of slavery throughout the island at that time, due to the intentions of Jean-Louis Ferrand. Haitians praise the attacks made against French troops whose intentions were to restore slavery that was abolished in Haiti years earlier.
 
Dominicans, however, have strongly asserted this as an unjustifiable genocide due to the killings of innocent civilians, with absolutely no regards to age, sex, or race. The significant population decrease, the atrocities committed during the invasion, and the absolute brutality of the massacre have also been used as evidence as unjustifiable. Because of the horrifying events described through the eyes of the survivors of the massacre, this massacre was marked as being the most bloody and dramatic Haitian invasion to Santo Domingo, (now Dominican Republic).

In popular culture 
Recognized in The Feast of the Goat – A novel book by Peruvian writer Mario Vargas Llosa.

See also 

 Siege of Santo Domingo (1805)
 Haitian occupation of Santo Domingo
 Dominican War of Independence
 Parsley Massacre
 Dominican Republic-Haiti relations

References

External links 
 1805 Massacre Of Santiago

Massacres in the Dominican Republic
Violent deaths in the Dominican Republic
History of the Dominican Republic
19th century in the Dominican Republic
First Empire of Haiti
Ethnic cleansing in North America
Genocides in North America
Genocidal massacres
Massacres in 1805
Dominican Republic–Haiti relations
Mass murder in 1805
April 1805 events
1805 in the Caribbean
Conflicts in 1805